Take You to the Sky is the fourth album by the progressive bluegrass band Northern Lights.

Track listing
 Northern Rail (Armerding) 4:42
 Hold Whatcha Got (Martin) 2:57
 The Roseville Fair (Staines) 3:29
 Early Morning Riser (Henry) 3:40
 Let It Roll (Barrere, Kibbee, Payne) 4:17
 T for Texas (Rodgers) 3:17
 Winterhawk (Armerding) 3:33
 Home Brew Fever (Crawford) 2:40
 April Snow (Kropp) 4:06
 Souvenirs (Prine) 3:54
 Back on My Mind Again (Ashforth) 3:14
 Bourée/Borealis Blues (Bach, Henry) 7:02

Personnel
 Taylor Armerding - mandolin, vocals
 Oz Barron - bass, vocals
 Bill Henry - vocals, guitar
 Mike Kropp - banjo, guitar

with
 Mat Glasser - violin
 Alison Krauss - violin
 Peter Rowan - vocals
 Bill Vorndick - drums

References

External links
Official site

1990 albums
Northern Lights (bluegrass band) albums